Anartia chrysopelea, the Cuban peacock or Caribbean peacock, is a species of butterfly generally only found in Cuba, although stray specimens have been encountered in Monroe County, Florida.

References

External links
Protein sequencing
"Anartia Hübner, [1819]" at Markku Savela's Lepidoptera and Some Other Life Forms

Anartia
Insects of Cuba
Endemic fauna of Cuba
Taxa named by Jacob Hübner
Butterflies described in 1831